
This is a list of postal codes in Canada where the first letter is B. Postal codes beginning with B are located within the Canadian province of Nova Scotia. Only the first three characters are listed, corresponding to the Forward Sortation Area.

Canada Post provides a free postal code look-up tool on its website, via its mobile apps for such smartphones as the iPhone and BlackBerry,  and sells hard-copy directories and CD-ROMs. Many vendors also sell validation tools, which allow customers to properly match addresses and postal codes. Hard-copy directories can also be consulted in all post offices, and some libraries.

Nova Scotia - 77 FSAs
B7* and B8* codes are not used.

Urban

Rural

Most populated FSAs
B0J, 42,621
B0P, 40,521
B0N, 39,763
B0K, 38,322
B0W, 32,905

Least populated FSAs
B2E, 33
B2J, 128
B2C, 346
B1T, 409
B3B, 792

References

B
Communications in Nova Scotia
Postal codes B